Manu Guix (Manuel Guix Tornos) (born 8 December 1979, in Barcelona, Spain) is a composer, musical director and Spanish performer. He has been linked to Operación Triunfo since its inception in 2001, and has acted as a coach in every edition of the program. His career began in 1987, at the Municipal Conservatory of Music in Barcelona and he also studied at the Liverpool Institute for Performing Arts.

He has recorded three works and participated in various musicals as a singer and musical director, including Grease.

Throughout he has won various awards including the Award Chair, received in 1997 for "You, Jo, Ell, Ella ... i ... i Schönberg Webber ..." at the revelation of the season show, and the same award granted in 1998 by "The Somni Mozart" as best musical director.

Awards and recognition
 1990: V Piano Competition Berga City (second prize)
 1992: 25 º Concours of Young Pianist of Catalonia, in Vilafranca Penedès (second prize)
 1997: Chair Award for the show "Yo, ho, ell, ella ... i ... i Schönberg Webber ..." the revelation of the season show
 1998: Chair Award for the show "El somni de Mozart" as best musical director
 1999: Scholarship from the Generalitat of Catalonia to study music abroad
 2008: Nominated for the Max Awards (twelfth edition) by the musical direction of Grease, the musical of your life
 2009: Nominated for  Gran Via Musical Theater for the musical direction of Grease, the musical of your life
 2009: Chair Award for the show What! The Nou Musical as best musical composition

References

External links
Personal web site

1979 births
Living people
Composers from Catalonia
Musicians from Barcelona
Alumni of the Liverpool Institute for Performing Arts
Música Global artists